John Edward Butler (born 7 February 1962) is an English former association footballer who played in the Football League for Wigan Athletic and Stoke City chalking up 300 senior appearances for both clubs.

A player of versatility, he played in all 11 positions on the pitch at some point in his career. His specialist position was right back. In a 16-season professional career, Butler played in three successful promotion campaigns that included lifting two divisional titles. He also won the Football League Trophy in 1992.

Career

Early years
Butler was born in Liverpool and grew up in the Wavertree area with his mother, step father, three brothers and one sister. He played football at non-league side Prescot Cables to whom he was introduced by Jimmy Wield, the man Butler cites as the person to give him a career as a professional footballer. Butler was being scouted by Liverpool with Geoff Twentyman and Tom Saunders scheduled to watch him. However the game in question was cancelled and Wigan Athletic seized the opportunity with assistant manager Harry McNally offering Butler terms the day after.

Wigan Athletic
Joining at Christmas at the age of 19 and soon establishing himself in the first team, Butler enjoyed success in his first season. In 1981–82 in English football under the management of Larry Lloyd, Wigan were promoted from the fourth to the third tier. The "Latics" finished third behind Sheffield United and Bradford City. Butler's versatility saw him play in all eleven positions on the pitch in his Wigan career including goalkeeper when Nigel Atkins was substituted in a game due to injury. Butler was the club player of the year in 1984. The best run of his career in the two major domestic cups was reaching the quarter finals in the 1986–87 FA Cup when Wigan were beaten 2–0 at home by Leeds United. His first spell at Wigan spanned seven seasons.

Stoke City
Mick Mills signed the then 26-year-old Butler for Stoke in 1988 for £100,000. He made his Stoke debut against Manchester City on boxing day and kept his place in the side for the remainder of the 1988–89 season. He became a key figure in the Stoke side in the early 1990s and only once in his six full seasons at Stoke did he fail to make over 40 first team appearances, 1990–91 when he still chalked up 37 first team games. He twice made over 50 first team appearances (1991–92 & 1992–93) and topped the club appearances chart outright in 1989–90 and jointly in 1991–92. Butler's first goal for Stoke came on 27 March 1989 in a 2–1 defeat away to Manchester City.

He picked up a winners medal from the 1992 Football League Trophy Final at Wembley Stadium under the management of Lou Macari. The game was a 1–0 win against Stockport County before a crowd of 48,339. The same two sides were pitted against each other in the end of season divisional play-offs. County won the first leg 1–0 and in the second leg Stoke could only draw 1–1 and remained in the Third Division.

Butler and Macari enjoyed another success together when in 1992–93 in English football Stoke won the Second Division title. After a slow start Stoke soon began to start winning and by 21 November 1992 Stoke were top of the table and remained there for the rest of the season and promotion was secured with a record of 93 points. Stoke also went on a club record 25 League games without defeat. He spent two more season at the Victoria Ground in 1993–94 and 1994–95 before being handed a free transfer in June 1995. In total he served with Stoke City for seven seasons amassing 319 appearances scoring nine goals.

Return to Wigan Athletic
Now aged 33, Butler returned to Wigan in 1995 and ended his last season in football (the 16th of his career) with a success. In 1996–97 in English football under the management of John Deehan he helped them win the Third Division title on goal difference ahead of Fulham. After two seasons in his second spell at Wigan, Butler left senior football at the age of 35 to play for Stalybridge Celtic.

Life after football
He lives in Ashton in Makerfield with his wife and remains a fan of football, particularly ex clubs Wigan and Stoke and also home town club Liverpool. Butler works as a driver for a courier company based in Golborne near Wigan.

Career statistics
Source:

Honours
 Wigan Athletic
 Football League Fourth Division promotion: 1981–82
 Football League Division Three champions 1996–97
 Player of the Year: 1984

 Stoke City
 Football League Trophy winner: 1992
 Division Two champions 1992–93

References

External links
 

English footballers
Stoke City F.C. players
Stalybridge Celtic F.C. players
Prescot Cables F.C. players
Wigan Athletic F.C. players
English Football League players
1962 births
Footballers from Liverpool
Living people
Association football fullbacks